Ulrich Kirchhoff (born 9 August 1967 in Lohne) is a German (until 2013) and Ukrainian show jumping rider, Olympic champion from 1996.

Olympic Record
Kirchhoff participated at the 1996 Summer Olympics in Atlanta, where he won a gold medal on the stallion Jus De Pommes in the Individual Jumping. At the same Olympics he also received a gold medal in Team jumping, together with Franke Sloothaak, Lars Nieberg and Ludger Beerbaum.

References

External links

1967 births
Living people
Olympic gold medalists for Germany
Equestrians at the 1996 Summer Olympics
Olympic equestrians of Germany
German male equestrians
Olympic medalists in equestrian
Medalists at the 1996 Summer Olympics
Ukrainian male equestrians
Equestrians at the 2016 Summer Olympics
Olympic equestrians of Ukraine
German emigrants to Ukraine
Naturalized citizens of Ukraine